A chori burger, also known as a chorizo burger, is a Filipino hamburger characteristically made with chorizo (longganisa) patties, banana ketchup, mayonnaise, and atchara, in addition to tomatoes and lettuce. It was first popularized by Merly's BBQ, a street food stall in the island of Boracay in the Philippines. A version of the burger with a half-longganisa and half-beef patty from Jeepney Restaurant was declared the best burger in New York City in Time Out's 2014 "Battle of the Burgers" competition.

See also 
 Coconut burger
 Longganisa

References 

Philippine cuisine
Hamburgers (food)